Marcin Bojarski (born August 28, 1977 in Częstochowa) is a Polish striker who has been playing for Puszcza Niepołomice since 2011.

External links 
 

1977 births
Living people
Polish footballers
Association football forwards
Legia Warsaw players
GKS Katowice players
MKS Cracovia (football) players
RKS Radomsko players
Pogoń Szczecin players
Ekstraklasa players
Sportspeople from Częstochowa